Dawid Szot (born 29 April 2001) is a Polish professional footballer who plays as a defender for Wisła Kraków.

Career

Szot started his career with Wisła Kraków.

References

External links

2001 births
Living people
Polish footballers
Association football defenders
Hutnik Nowa Huta players
Wisła Kraków players
Ekstraklasa players
Footballers from Kraków